The 2021 Superettan is part of the 2021 Swedish football season, and the 21st season of Superettan, Sweden's second-tier football division in its current format. A total of 16 teams contest the league.

Teams
A total of 16 teams contest the league. The top two teams qualify directly for promotion to Allsvenskan, the third will enter a play-off for the chance of promotion. The two bottom teams are automatically relegated, while the 13th and 14th placed teams will compete in a play-off to determine whether they are relegated.

Stadiums and locations

League table

Relegation play-offs
The 13th-placed and 14th-placed teams of Superettan met the two runners-up from 2021 Division 1 (Norra and Södra) in two-legged ties on a home-and-away basis with the teams from Superettan finishing at home.

Skövde AIK won 3–0 on aggregate and are promoted.

 
Dalkurd FF won 3–2 on aggregate and are promoted.

Positions by round

Results by round

Results

Season statistics

Top scorers

Top assists

Hat-tricks

Discipline

Player
 Most yellow cards: 10 
 Filip Tronêt (Västerås SK)

 Most red cards: 3
 Filip Almström Tähti (Västerås SK)

Club
 Most yellow cards: 75
 AFC Eskilstuna

 Most red cards: 4
 AFC Eskilstuna
 Landskrona BoIS

References

External links 

 Swedish Football Association – Superettan

Superettan seasons
2021 in Swedish association football leagues
Sweden
Sweden

Copied content from 2020 Superettan; see that page's history for attribution